Kloss's squirrel or Kloss squirrel (Callosciurus albescens) is a species of rodent in the family Sciuridae. It is endemic to northern Sumatra in Indonesia. Population data is insufficient to assess its conservation status according to the IUCN. It is sometimes considered a subspecies of C. notatus.

References

Thorington, R. W. Jr. and R. S. Hoffman. 2005. Family Sciuridae. pp. 754–818 in Mammal Species of the World a Taxonomic and Geographic Reference. D. E. Wilson and D. M. Reeder eds. Johns Hopkins University Press, Baltimore.

Callosciurus
Rodents of Indonesia
Mammals described in 1901